The 1978 Campeonato Ecuatoriano de Fútbol de la Serie A was the 20th national championship for football teams in Ecuador.

Teams
The number of teams for this season was played by 12 teams. Bonita Banana and Valdez promoted as winners of First Stage of Serie B.

First stage

Second stage

Liguilla Final

References

External links
 RSSSF - Ecuador 1978
 Artículo Oficial de El Nacional Campeón Nacional 1978 en la página web del Diario El Universo
 Línea de Tiempo de eventos y partidos de Liga Deportiva Universitaria
 Calendario de partidos históricos de Liga Deportiva Universitaria
 Sistema de Consulta Interactiva y Herramienta de consulta interactiva de partidos de Liga Deportiva Universitaria

1978
Ecu